Free Your Mind may refer to:

 Free Your Mind (Cut Copy album), 2013
 Free Your Mind (Maliq & D'Essentials album), 2007
 Free Your Mind (MTV award), an award granted by MTV
 "Free Your Mind" (song), a 1992 song by En Vogue
 Free Your Mind (EP), a 2009 EP by Anarbor
 Free Your Mind 33, a 1998 album by Dragon Ash
 Free Your Mind... and Your Ass Will Follow, a 1970 album by Funkadelic